In rowing there are not world records due to the huge variability that weather conditions can have on times. Instead there are world best times, which are set over the international rowing distance of 2000 m.

On water records
Rowing times are strongly affected by weather conditions, and to a lesser extent by water temperature – the majority of these times were set in warm water with a strong tailwind. World best rowing times have also decreased because of improvements in technology to both the boats and the oars, along with improvements in the conditioning of the rowers.

Because environmental conditions have a strong impact on boat speed, FISA recognizes world best times instead of world records. A world best time is one recorded on a regatta course that has previously held the World Championships, Olympic Games, or World Cup since 1980. A number of record times were set at the 2005 World Rowing Championships held on the Nagara River at Kaizu, Gifu Prefecture, Japan, but due to a fast current caused by heavy rainfall from the remnants of Typhoon Mawar, FISA declared that the race results were not eligible to be considered as world best times.

There is a category for lightweight rowing.

Hamish Bond and Eric Murray hold the record for most consecutive wins with 69.

Men

The greatest distance rowed in 24 hours is 342 km (212.5 miles) by Hannes Obreno, Pierre de Loof, Tim Brys, Mathieu Foucaud, Thijs Obreno, Giel Vanschoenbeek, Arjan van Belle and Thibaut Schollaert (all Belgians) on the Watersportbaan in Ghent, Belgium on 2–3 October 2014. All eight participants were members of a student rowing club called VSR (Vlaamse Studentenvereniging der Roeiers, translates to Flanders Student Rowing Club).

The greatest distance rowed in 1 hour is 17,555 m (10.91 miles) by the Delftse Studenten Roeiverening Proteus-Eretes during the Hour boat race on 17 December 2017.

Women

Indoor records
These results are based on a standard distance of 2,000 meters.
SIR - Static Indoor Rower (Indoor Rower)
IRwS - Indoor Rower with Slides (Slides)
DIR - Dynamic Indoor Rower (Dynamic)

Lwt Men:  maximum weight
Lwt Women:  maximum weight 

Note: the standard machine for indoor records is the Concept2 indoor rower. "Split" refers to the average time to complete 500 m (i.e. the 2000 m time divided by 4).

References

External links 
FISA - Best Times
Concept2 - World Records
Concept2 - British Records
Concept2 - Other Records

Rec
Sports world records